A county administrative board is a Swedish Government Agency in each of the counties of Sweden, led by a vice-regal governor appointed by the government for a term of six years. The lists of gubernatorial officeholders, in most cases, stretches back to 1634 when the counties were created by Chancellor Axel Oxenstierna.

The main responsibilities of the county administrative board is to coordinate the development of the county in line with goals set in national politics. In each county there is also a County Council which is a policy-making assembly elected by the residents of the county.

The capital of a county is in Swedish called residensstad ("residence city") because it is the seat of residence of the governor.

See also 
Governor of Stockholm
List of Swedish Governors-General
Provincial Governors of Finland

External links 
Official site of the Swedish government

Government agencies of Sweden
Public finance of Sweden
Sweden geography-related lists
Sweden politics-related lists